Order of St. Benedict of New Jersey v. Steinhauser, 234 U.S. 640 (1914), was a United States Supreme Court case in which the Court held that when someone joins an ecclesiastical order, subject to individual state law, their income from copyright may be dedicated to that order's common fund as much as any other income or form of property. This does not violate any part of the Constitution if the member may withdraw from the order at any time.

References

External links
 

1914 in United States case law
United States copyright case law
United States Supreme Court cases
United States Supreme Court cases of the White Court